Cian O'Callaghan (born 1994) is an Irish hurler who plays for Dublin Senior Championship club Cuala and at inter-county level with the Dublin senior hurling team. He currently lines out as a left corner-back.

Honours

Cuala
All-Ireland Senior Club Hurling Championship: 2017, 2018
Leinster Senior Club Hurling Championship: 2016, 2017
Dublin Senior Hurling Championship: 2015, 2016, 2017, 2019, 2020

Dublin 
Leinster Minor Hurling Championship: 2011, 2012

References

External link
Cian O'Callaghan profile at the Dublin GAA website

1994 births
Living people
UCD hurlers
Cuala hurlers
Dublin inter-county hurlers